Lin Chao-chun (born 31 October 1972) is a Taiwanese footballer who played as a forward for the Chinese Taipei women's national football team. She was part of the team at the 1991 FIFA Women's World Cup. On club level she played for Taiwan PE College in Taiwan.

References

External links
 

1972 births
Living people
Taiwanese women's footballers
Chinese Taipei women's international footballers
Place of birth missing (living people)
1991 FIFA Women's World Cup players
Women's association football forwards